Tete Yengi (born 28 November 2000) is an Australian professional soccer player who plays for Northampton Town, on loan from Ipswich Town as a forward. Yengi recently played for Newcastle Jets.

Career

Ipswich Town
In September 2021, Yengi signed for League One club Ipswich Town on a one-year deal with the option for a further year, originally joining the team's Under 23 side.

In April 2022, Yengi joined VPS on loan for the 2022 season. During his time in Finland, Yengi scored seven goals and assisted a further eleven, winning his club's Player of the Year award.

On 31 January 2023, Yengi signed a new eighteen-month contract and subsequently joined League Two club Northampton Town on loan until the end of the season.

Personal life
Yengi's older brother, Kusini, plays as a forward for Western Sydney Wanderers.

References

External links

2000 births
Living people
Australian soccer players
Association football forwards
Croydon Kings players
Adelaide Comets FC players
Newcastle Jets FC players
Ipswich Town F.C. players
Vaasan Palloseura players
Northampton Town F.C. players
National Premier Leagues players
A-League Men players
Veikkausliiga players
Australian expatriate soccer players
Expatriate footballers in England
Australian expatriate sportspeople in England
Expatriate footballers in Finland
Australian expatriate sportspeople in Finland